Mary Franson (born March 1, 1977) is a Minnesota politician and member of the Minnesota House of Representatives. A member of the Republican Party of Minnesota, she represents District 12B, which includes portions of Douglas, Stearns and Pope counties in the west central part of the state. She is also a licensed child care provider and a former employee of AT&T.

Early life and education 
Franson graduated from AlBrook High School in Saginaw and the University of Minnesota Duluth in Duluth with a B.A. in psychology and humanities. She and her family live in Alexandria.

Political career 
Franson was first elected to the House in 2010, succeeding Rep. Mary Ellen Otremba, who did not seek re-election.

On election night, November 6, 2012, Franson ended the night with a one-vote margin of victory, triggering an automatic recount under Minnesota law. After 32 voters received ballots for the incorrect race and three additional voters were not accounted for on the voter tally, a judge ruled that 35 ballots should be pulled from the total at random. The new ballots were counted, and Franson had a 12-vote lead. Challenger Bob Cunniff conceded on November 29.

As of November 2022, Franson has won seven straight terms to the Minnesota House.

Franson has served on several committees during her legislative career, including committees for Health and Human Services Finance, Early Childhood Finance and Policy, Higher Education Finance & Policy, Health & Human Services Reform, Aging & Long-Term Care Policy, and was the chair for the Subcommittee on Childcare Access & Affordability.

Political positions

Abortion 
In 2017, Franson authored a bill to ban any funds from all state-funded healthcare programs from being used for abortions. While the bill passed both houses of the Minnesota State Legislature, then-Governor Mark Dayton ultimately vetoed it.

Child care 
As a former child-care provider, Franson has authored multiple bills on child-care-related issues. She was a vocal opponent of an executive order issued by then-Governor Mark Dayton allowing for the unionization of child-care providers. In May 2018, Franson called for the state to take action against child-care fraud in Minnesota uncovered by KMSP-TV. That same month, Governor Dayton signed into law a bill authored by Franson that unanimously passed both of Minnesota's legislative houses. The bill cut regulations on child-care providers that were viewed as burdensome.

Environment 
On April 20, 2012, Franson objected to the opening prayer on the House floor, where the House Chaplain Rev. Francis Grady mentioned Earth Day and tied it to the Gulf oil spill. Franson tweeted that the prayer "may as well been dedicated to 'Mother Earth', coincidence? I think not. 2nd offensive prayer in a month."

In June 2018, Franson was one of four Republican legislators who secured state funding to help clean up two lakes in Alexandria, Minnesota.

Gun control 
After the March for Our Lives demonstration on March 24, 2018, Franson authored and shared several posts on Facebook that critics claimed were comparing the survivors of the Stoneman Douglas High School shooting to the Hitler Youth. On March 27, Franson said that she did not intend to link the protesters to Hitler Youth. On March 28, she apologized and said, "Because of the timing of my posts, I now understand why it appears that I was making a comparison."

Healthcare 
Franson authored a bill protecting up to $25,000 of an individual's healthcare saving from debt collectors. The bill was passed unanimously by both Minnesota legislative houses and signed into law by Governor Dayton on May 3, 2018.

On July 1, 2018, a law authored by Franson requiring the licensing of athletic trainers took effect in Minnesota.

LGBT issues 
Franson was one of the authors of a bill, introduced on April 28, 2011, seeking to amend the Minnesota State Constitution to define marriage as being "recognized as only a union between one man and one woman."

On April 8, 2014, Franson characterized an anti-bullying bill as "fascism" and an "attack on the Bible and conservative Christians."

On November 9, 2017, after the election of transgender politicians Andrea Jenkins and Phillipe Cunningham to the Minneapolis City Council earlier in the week, Franson tweeted that "A guy who thinks he's a girl is still a guy with a mental health condition." The tweet drew criticism from fellow state lawmakers, many of whom pointed out that being transgender is not considered a mental illness by the American Psychological Association. Franson posted a defiant apology on Facebook, stating that she does "not apologize for not conforming to the PC world where I'm supposed to go along with fantasy and participate in it. This isn't the first time I've offended the social justice warriors and it won't be the last."

Women's issues 
Franson has authored a bill to ban female genital mutilation in Minnesota.

Electoral history

References

External links 

 Rep. Franson Web Page
 Project Votesmart - Rep. Mary Franson profile
 Mary Franson Campaign website
 Official Twitter page

1977 births
Living people
Republican Party members of the Minnesota House of Representatives
University of Minnesota Duluth alumni
Women state legislators in Minnesota
AT&T people
21st-century American politicians
21st-century American women politicians
People from Alexandria, Minnesota